Fort Bowyer was a short-lived earthen and stockade fortification that the United States Army erected in 1813 on Mobile Point, near the mouth of Mobile Bay in what is now Baldwin County, Alabama, but then was part of the Mississippi Territory. The British twice attacked the fort during the War of 1812.

The first attack took place in September 1814; unsuccessful, it led to the British changing their strategy and attacking New Orleans. The second attack, following the Battle of New Orleans, was successful. It took place in February 1815, after the Treaty of Ghent had been signed but before the news had reached that part of America. Between 1819 and 1834 the United States built a new masonry fortification, Fort Morgan, on the site of Fort Bowyer.

Construction

Mobile had been a Spanish possession before the beginning of the Patriot War, but Congress had declared it American territory after the War of 1812 started. After Spanish forces evacuated Mobile in April 1813, the Americans built a redoubt on Mobile Point.

In June 1813, Colonel John Bowyer completed the fort. The fort, which initially had 14 guns, was made of sand and logs and fan-shaped, with the curved face facing the ship channel into Mobile Bay. On the landward side there was a bastion, flanked by two demi-bastions. The fort's purpose was to impede any British invasion at this point on the Gulf Coast, as the fort commanded the narrow entrance to Mobile Bay. About a year after the fort's construction, the Americans abandoned it, but in August 1814, Major William Lawrence and 160 men from the 2nd U.S. Infantry re-garrisoned it.

First battle

The First Battle of Fort Bowyer took place in mid-September, 1814. Captain William Percy of the Royal Navy decided to attack the fort in preparation for an assault on Mobile. He believed Bowyer to be a low, wooden battery mounting some six to 14 small caliber guns.

Background
Capturing the fort would enable the British to move on Mobile and thereby block Louisiana's trade. From Mobile, the British could move overland to Natchez to cut off New Orleans from the north.

Percy took with him  (22 guns),  (18 guns),  (20 guns; Captain Robert Cavendish Spencer), and a fourth vessel,  (18 guns; Capt. Umfreville). Lieutenant Colonel Edward Nicolls volunteered to proceed with diversionary forces on land.

On the morning of 12 September, Percy landed Nicolls's force of 60 Royal Marines, and about 60 Indians, together with a -inch howitzer, about 9 miles to the eastward. The British land force then marched against the fort and Lawrence's 160 men.

A further sixty Indians, under First Lieutenant James Cassell, had been detached to secure the pass of Bon Secour 27 miles to the east of the fort, but they played no active part in the attack itself.

The American forces in Fort Bowyer, commanded by William Lawrence, consisted of 160 infantry, and a disputed number of cannon (reports range between 6 and 14 guns).

Battle
The battle began with the Americans repulsing the British land attack on 14 September. Nicolls, ill at the time, was observing on Hermes. On 15 September, after contrary winds had died down, Percy crossed the bar with Hermes, Sophie, Carron, and Childers. The fort opened fire at 3:20 p.m. and at 3:30 Hermes opened fire. The U.S. fort and Hermes were at musket-shot range. At 3:40, Sophie opened fire also, but the other two vessels were not able to get into a firing position. During the battle a wooden splinter wounded Nicolls in the eye.

The British naval attack was unsuccessful. After two hours of fruitless bombardment, Hermes ran aground and lay helpless under the fire from the fort. Sophie's boats took off Hermes crew and Percy set her on fire; she subsequently blew up after the fire reached her magazine. The remaining ships anchored for the night some one and half miles from the fort.

Aftermath
The next morning they re-crossed the bar and sailed away. Hermes had lost 17 killed in action, 5 mortally wounded and 19 wounded, while Sophie had 6 killed in action, 4 mortally wounded and 12 wounded, and the Carron had one mortally wounded, and 5 wounded. In all, including the marine killed on shore (Charles Butcher), the British lost 34 killed and 35 wounded in the land and naval attacks, while the Americans lost only four men killed and five or more wounded. Percy's court-martial for the loss of Hermes concluded that the circumstances had warranted the attack.

The defeat at Fort Bowyer led the British to decide to attack New Orleans instead.  However, after their defeat at the Battle of New Orleans, the British decided to try again to take Mobile.

Second battle

The Second Battle of Fort Bowyer was the first step in a British campaign against Mobile, but turned out to be the last land engagement between British and American forces in the War of 1812.

Background
After the unsuccessful British attack in September 1814, American General Andrew Jackson, recognizing Fort Bowyer's strategic importance, ordered the fort strengthened. Now its garrison comprised 370 officers and men of the 2nd Infantry Regiment, and Jackson proclaimed "ten thousand men cannot take it". Despite Jackson's bravado, Lawrence, in command of the fort, described his position as precarious because of the undefended landward approaches to the fort.

Following the defeat at New Orleans, Admiral Cochrane and General John Lambert (replacing Pakenham) received some considerable reinforcements, and then went back to the original plan, before New Orleans, which had been to take Mobile first.

The British troops came from the 4th, 21st, and 44th Regiments of Foot, who had fought at New Orleans. The commander of the naval forces was Captain T.R. Ricketts of the 74-gun third-rate, . Captain Spencer of the Carron was among the sailors landed near Mobile, and was second in command of the naval party.

When the British captured the fort, they discovered that it mounted three long 32-pounders, eight 24s, six 12s, five 9s, a mortar, and a howitzer. However, Fort Bowyer's weakness was its vulnerability to an attack from the landward side.

Battle
The British campaign began with an investiture of Fort Bowyer. On 8 February, Lambert landed a force of around 1,000 men seven miles east of the fort.  The Royal Engineer Colonel Burgoyne surveyed the fort and decided on the method of attack. That night a 100 yard parallel was dug, at the loss of 10-12 men, which in the morning was occupied by soldiers who kept up such a musket fire on the fort that the enemy could not make any effectual reply.

The next night the parallel was extended and the following night four batteries were completed. The troops brought with them four 18-pounder cannons, two 8-inch howitzers, three -inch and two 4.4-inch mortars. In addition to these eleven conventional artillery pieces,  landed Lieutenant John Lawrence's 25-man detachment of Royal Marine Artillery with several Congreve rocket launchers, two 6-pounder rockets, and a hundred 12-pounder rockets. While they were constructing their siege works, the British forces endured constant American fire and took light casualties, but continued undeterred. Once their guns were in place, the British were ready to launch a devastating artillery attack on the now vulnerable fort.

On February 12 after a barrage of artillery, Lambert, under a flag of truce, called on the fort to surrender. He demanded that Major Lawrence accept British terms to prevent the needless slaughter of his men. Lawrence realised the vulnerability of the fort. It had no casemates to protect the gunpowder magazine, or the wounded, and it lacked land facing ramparts, which would cost a lot of men to defend. Lawrence reluctantly surrendered to the British, after having resisted for five days. An alternative history from British sources explains that on 11 February, before opening fire, Lambert called upon the fort to surrender. After negotiations, it was agreed that the Americans would leave as prisoners of war the following morning. The Governor reportedly begged for the delay "as so many of his men had got drunk." That was agreed to, with the gate of the fort moving to British control on 11 February, according to a British regimental historian.

Aftermath

With Mobile Bay secured by British warships and Fort Bowyer now under British control, the remaining American forces in the area hurried to Mobile to prepare for the expected onslaught there.  With Fort Bowyer under control, Admiral Cochrane and General Lambert's next move was to take Mobile.

All British plans were cancelled when  arrived on 13 February, carrying news that the Treaty of Ghent had been signed on the previous Christmas Eve. When news of ratification of the treaty arrived, ending the war, the British withdrew.

The final attachment of Mobile to the United States from the Spanish Empire was the only permanent exchange of territory during the War of 1812.

Fort Bowyer subsequently reverted to U.S. control. The War Department would later replace it with the more heavily fortified Fort Morgan.

Two active battalions of the Regular Army (1-1 Inf and 2-1 Inf) perpetuate the lineage of elements of the old 2nd Infantry that was present at Fort Bowyer in both 1814 and 1815.

See also
 List of conflicts in the United States

Notes, citations, and references
Notes

Citations

References
 Brenton, Edward Pelham (1823) The naval history of Great Britain from the year MDCCLXXXIII to MDCCCXXIII. (London: C. Rice).
 
 
 Eaton, John Henry, and Jerome Van Crowninshield Smith (1834) Memoirs of Andrew Jackson: late major general and commander in chief of the Southern division of the army of the United States. (Philadelphia)
 Elting, John (1995) Amateurs, to arms!: a military history of the War of 1812 (Chapel Hill: Algonquin Books)
 England, Bob, Jack Friend, Michael Bailey, and Blanton Blankenship (2000) Fort Morgan. (Charleston, CS: Arcadia).
 Fraser, Edward, & L. G. Carr-Laughton (1930). The Royal Marine Artillery 1804–1923, Volume 1 [1804–1859]. London: The Royal United Services Institution. 
 Heidler, David Stephen & Jeanne T. Heidler (2004) Encyclopedia of the War of 1812. (Annapolis, Maryland; Naval Institute Press;1997). 
 
 James, William (1818) A Full and Correct Account of the Military Occurrences of the Late War Between Great Britain and the United States of America. (London, Printed for the Author). .
 Latour, Arsène Lacarrière (1816) Historical memoir of the war in West Florida and Louisiana in 1814-15. (Philadelphia: John Conrad & Co)
 Lossing, Benson John (1868) The pictorial field-book of the war of 1812: or, illustrations, by pen and pencil, of the history, biography, scenery, relics, and traditions of the last war for American independence. (New York: Harper & Bros.)
 Malcomson, Robert (2006) Historical dictionary of the War of 1812. (Lanham, Maryland: Scarecrow Press).
 
 
 
 
 Quimby, Robert S. (1997) The U.S. Army in the War of 1812: An Operational and Command Study. (Michigan State University Press, East Lansing, Michigan). 
 Remini, Robert Vincent (2001) The Battle of New Orleans. (New York: Penguin Books)
 
 
 Tucker, Spencer (ed). (2012): 'The Encyclopedia of the War of 1812: A Political, Social, and Military History'. ABC-CLIO.

External links
 http://www.mywarof1812.com/battles/150211.htm
 http://www.1812casualties.org/
 Attack on Fort Bowyer September 1814

Bowyer
Conflicts in 1815
Bowyer
Pre-statehood history of Alabama
Buildings and structures in Baldwin County, Alabama
Battles of the War of 1812 in Alabama
Naval battles of the War of 1812
Bowyer
Bowyer
Bowyer
Bowyer
Battles in the Gulf Theater 1813–1815